Lage Zwaluwe is a railway station near Lage Zwaluwe and Moerdijk, Netherlands. The station was opened in 1883 and is located on the Breda–Rotterdam railway between Breda and Dordrecht and the Antwerp–Lage Zwaluwe railway. The services are operated by Nederlandse Spoorwegen.

It is situated in the municipality of Moerdijk.

Destinations

Current destinations 
The following major destinations are directly possible from Lage Zwaluwe:
Dordrecht, Breda, 's-Hertogenbosch and Roosendaal (see Train services below).

Former destinations 
Lage Zwaluwe railway station is the start point of the defunct Lage Zwaluwe-'s-Hertogenbosch railway via Waalwijk, which now runs no further than Oosterhout and only for freight.

Train services
The following services currently call at Lage Zwaluwe:
2x per hour local service (sprinter) Dordrecht - Breda - Tilburg - 's-Hertogenbosch - Arnhem
2x per hour local service (sprinter) Dordrecht - Roosendaal

External links
NS website 
Dutch Public Transport journey planner 

Railway stations in North Brabant
Railway stations opened in 1883
Railway stations on the Staatslijn I
Transport in Moerdijk